Grand Prix Manager (GPM) is a Formula 1 management game released in December 1995 by MicroProse. It featured the 1995 Formula 1 season.

Description 
The goal of this game is to manage a successful Formula 1 Grand Prix racing team and eventually win the in-game racing championship.

Reception
GameSpot said for the PC, "Grand Prix Manager gives you the opportunity to live the exciting life of the GP circuit in the comfort of your own home." GameSpot also rated the game 6.4 (fair). A Next Generation critic, while acknowledging that the game succeeds at its goal of being a comprehensive and accurate simulation of being a Formula One team manager, argued that the experience is not fun: "People work day in and day out accomplishing the tasks this game sets before you, but they get paid to deal with cranky vendors, snotty drivers, and touchy mechanics. Why shell out $50 for the same experience?" He scored it 2 out of 5 stars.

The sequel to this title is Grand Prix Manager 2, which depicts the 1996 Formula 1 season.

References 

1995 video games
Formula One video games
Sports management video games
Video games developed in the United Kingdom
Windows games
Windows-only games